Shemozzle (or Shemozzle race) is a New Zealand obstacle course activity, often involving a dog.

Rangitikei 
The shepherd's shemozzle was the trademark race of the Hunterville Huntaway Festival, Rangitikei's signature event.

In popular culture 
 In 2012, the activity was performed by television presenter Daisuke Miyagawa for the Japanese television show 'Sekai no Hate Made – ItteQ'. 
 In 2013, an episode of the American version of The Amazing Race featured a shemozzle race in a Roadblock task.

References

External links 
Hunterville Huntaway Festival - shemozzle

Sport in New Zealand
Dog sports
Obstacle racing
Sports originating in New Zealand